The Chilean water crisis is a period of extreme water scarcity and drought in Chile that began in 2010 in response to climate change, agricultural practices and the existing policies established in the early 1980s. It is the longest lasting drought experienced in Chile in over 1,000 years.

History

Economy and politics 
The 1980 Constitution of Chile created under the dictatorship of Augusto Pinochet recognizes water as a private property and in 1981, his government rewrote laws regulating water, granting the sale and privatization of water in a manner similar to the stock market. The sale of water rights has been one of the primary factors that led to lower water levels in some areas. Chile's economy developed into mainly extractivism and due to the privatization of water; by 2022, forestry—representing 3% of the nation's gross domestic product—consumed 59% of Chile's water, agriculture used 37% and only 2% was allocated for human consumption.

Drought 
Chile began to experience a drought in 2010 and by 2020, precipitation was 20–45% of average nationally and 10–20% of average in the area of Santiago. According to René D. Garreaud, of the University of Chile, the drought was the most extreme in the area in over 1,000 years. During the Petorca water crisis, it was found in 2011 that large agricultural companies were stealing water from water outlets of the Petorca River. 

The Drought is caused by an anomalous and persistent blob of high pressure in the Southern Pacific Ocean, which has been attributed to reduced moisture and a lack of precipitation.

By 2020, nearly 500,000 Chileans relied on water transport trucks and tens of thousands of animals died from drought. In 2021, research published by the Journal of Climate stated that a "Southern Blob" partially caused by climate change was exacerbating the drought. By 2022, Chile was ranked 16th of 164 for water stress in the world according to the University of Chile. In April 2022, Chile instituted a four-tiered water rationing plan; the second level included a public announcement, the third would lower water pressure and the most extreme level would rotate water stoppages for 24 hours.

Notable events
1985 – First year in modern times that Petorca River dries out according to Lorena Donaire of Modatima. 
2018 – Laguna de Aculeo is since 2018 a dry lake. The drying of lake is the result of below-average rainfall over the past decade and also because of human activity which are diverting rivers and pumping groundwater from aquifers, which both had replenished the lake. 
2022 
The reservoir Embalse de Peñuela dries up. 
For the first time in history, a water rationing plan is announced for Santiago.
2023 
For the first time ever, the Ministry of Agriculture declares Magallanes Region, Chile's southernmost region, in "agricultural alert" caused by drought. The events leading up this situation are the years of 2022 and 2021 which had low precipitations. 2021 in particular was the fourth driest known year since meterological records began.
Maipo River's inability to break through its mouth bar that following a storm surge in January 2023 had come to separate it from the ocean has been credited to low discharge rates caused by excessive uptakes of water upstream.

See also 

 Drought in Chile

References 

Climate change in Chile
Droughts in South America
Water in Chile
21st-century disasters in Chile